Oliver Petrak (born 6 February 1991) is a Croatian footballer who currently plays for Croatian second tier outfit Croatia Zmijavci.

Career

Club
Petrak signed for FC Ordabasy in July 2017 on a one-year contract, but left the club at the end of the 2017 season.

On 29 June 2019, he joined Lokomotiva Zagreb.

References

External links
 

1991 births
Living people
Footballers from Zagreb
Association football midfielders
Croatian footballers
Croatia youth international footballers
NK Lučko players
NK Sesvete players
HŠK Zrinjski Mostar players
FC Ordabasy players
Korona Kielce players
NK Lokomotiva Zagreb players
NK Krško players
Croatian Football League players
First Football League (Croatia) players
Premier League of Bosnia and Herzegovina players
Kazakhstan Premier League players
Ekstraklasa players
Slovenian Second League players
Croatian expatriate footballers
Expatriate footballers in Bosnia and Herzegovina
Croatian expatriate sportspeople in Bosnia and Herzegovina
Expatriate footballers in Kazakhstan
Croatian expatriate sportspeople in Kazakhstan
Expatriate footballers in Poland
Croatian expatriate sportspeople in Poland
Expatriate footballers in Slovenia
Croatian expatriate sportspeople in Slovenia